In mathematics, the Brauer–Siegel theorem, named after Richard Brauer and Carl Ludwig Siegel, is an asymptotic result on the behaviour of algebraic number fields, obtained by Richard Brauer and Carl Ludwig Siegel. It attempts to generalise the results known on the class numbers of imaginary quadratic fields, to a more general sequence of number fields

In all cases other than the rational field Q and imaginary quadratic fields, the regulator Ri of Ki must be taken into account, because Ki then has units of infinite order by Dirichlet's unit theorem. The quantitative hypothesis of the standard Brauer–Siegel theorem is that if Di is the discriminant of Ki, then

 

Assuming that, and the algebraic hypothesis that Ki is a Galois extension of Q, the conclusion is that

 

where hi is the class number of Ki. If one assumes that all the degrees  are bounded above by a uniform constant
N, then one may drop the assumption of normality - this is what is actually proved in Brauer's paper. 

This result is ineffective, as indeed was the result on quadratic fields on which it built. Effective results in the same direction were initiated in work of Harold Stark from the early 1970s.

References
 Richard Brauer, On the Zeta-Function of Algebraic Number Fields, American Journal of Mathematics 69 (1947), 243–250.

Analytic number theory
Theorems in algebraic number theory